India Book House Pvt. Limited (IBH) is an importer, distributor and publisher of books and magazines in India.

Formed in 1952, India Book House published paperback editions of children's authors such as Enid Blyton and Frederick Forsyth, as well as comics such as The Adventures of Tintin and Asterix, often in Indian languages as well. Their most famous series is the Amar Chitra Katha comics line that retells stories from the great Indian epics, mythology, history, folklore, and fables. In 2007, the imprint and all its titles were acquired by ACK Media Pvt. Limited which owns brands such as Amar Chitra Katha and Tinkle. The new entity IBH Books and Magazines Distributors Pvt. Ltd, is one of the leading publishers of illustrated volumes on Indian history and heritage, specializing in architecture, fine art, decorative art, film, environment, and lifestyle

India Book House is headquartered in Mumbai. It has now been merged with the Oxford Bookstore and Stationery Company and is one of the largest book wholesalers in India.

See also
List of book distributors

References

Comic book publishing companies of India
Book publishing companies of India
Companies based in Mumbai
Book distributors
1952 establishments in Bombay State
Indian companies established in 1952